George Edward Moose (born June 23, 1944) is an American diplomat who has served as the chair of the board of directors of the United States Institute of Peace since 2021. He formerly served as assistant secretary of state for african affairs from 1993 to 1997, ambassador to the UN agencies in Geneva from 1997 to 2001, and as Ambassador to the Republics of Benin and Senegal in the 1980s and 1990s. He is primarily known for serving as Assistant Secretary of State for African Affairs in the Clinton Administration during the Rwandan genocide.

Biography
George Moose was born in New York City in 1944 and was raised in Denver, Colorado. He earned a degree from Grinnell College and attended the Maxwell School of Syracuse University before entering the Foreign Service in 1967. Ambassador Moose had early assignments in Washington D.C., Barbados, Vietnam, and the U.N. in New York. He speaks Vietnamese and French.

Secretary Moose headed the American delegation which participated in the first Tokyo International Conference on African Development in October 1993.

In 2002 he was promoted to the rank of Career Ambassador.

Moose is currently teaching a course at the George Washington University Elliott School of International Affairs entitled "Reinventing the United Nations" and is currently a fellow at the Harvard University Institute of Politics, where he leads a study group on Africa in the multilateral system. He has served on the Board of Directors of Search for Common Ground since 2003.

References

External links
Legacy  Ambassador George E.Moose donated high-definition audiovisual life story interviews to Legacy.
United States Department of State: Career of George Edward Moose

1944 births
Living people
Atlantic Council
People from Denver
Grinnell College alumni
Syracuse University alumni
United States Career Ambassadors
Assistant Secretaries of State for African Affairs
George Washington University faculty
Harvard Fellows
African-American diplomats
Ambassadors of the United States to Benin
Ambassadors of the United States to Senegal
United States Foreign Service personnel
20th-century American diplomats